The 2012 UniCredit Czech Open was a professional tennis tournament played on clay courts. It was the 19th edition of the tournament which was part of the 2012 ATP Challenger Tour. It took place in Prostějov, Czech Republic between 4 and 10 June 2012.

Singles main draw entrants

Seeds

 1 Rankings are as of May 28, 2012.

Other entrants
The following players received wildcards into the singles main draw:
  Florian Mayer
  Radek Štěpánek
  Fernando Verdasco
  Jiří Veselý

The following players received entry as an alternate into the singles main draw:
  Kamil Čapkovič
  Pavol Červenák
  Víctor Estrella

The following players received entry from the qualifying draw:
  Uladzimir Ignatik
  Axel Michon
  Jaroslav Pospíšil
  Marek Semjan

Champions

Singles

 Florian Mayer def.  Jan Hájek, 7–6(7–1), 3–6, 7–6(7–3)

Doubles

 Hsieh Cheng-peng /  Lee Hsin-han def.  Colin Ebelthite /  John Peers, 7–5, 7–5

External links
Official Website

UniCredit Czech Open
Czech Open (tennis)
2012 in Czech tennis
June 2012 sports events in Europe